Lesnoy is a closed town in Sverdlovsk Oblast, Russia, located  north of Yekaterinburg on the banks of the Tura River. Population:

History
It was founded in 1947 when Plant 418 was constructed to produce highly enriched uranium (HEU) for the production of nuclear weapons. Nuclear weapons were also assembled there. In 1954, it became the closed town of Sverdlovsk-45 to support production of nuclear weapons.

Sverdlovsk-45 remained secret until President Boris Yeltsin decreed in 1992 that such places could use their historical names; the town had not appeared on official maps until then.

Administrative and municipal status
Within the framework of the administrative divisions, it is, together with one work settlement and three rural localities, incorporated as the closed administrative-territorial formation of Lesnoy—an administrative unit with the status equal to that of the districts. As a municipal division, the closed administrative-territorial formation of Lesnoy is incorporated as Lesnoy Urban Okrug.

References

Notes

Sources

Cities and towns in Sverdlovsk Oblast
Closed cities
Naukograds
1947 establishments in the Soviet Union
Populated places established in 1947